The 1996 Florida Citrus Bowl was a college football bowl game featuring the Ohio State Buckeyes of the Big Ten, against the Tennessee Volunteers of the SEC. The Buckeyes were sparked by their senior Heisman Trophy winner running back Eddie George. The Vols were led by sophomore quarterback Peyton Manning. Both teams entered the game with losses to rival teams.

The Buckeyes started off the season with a surprising win over Notre Dame. However, the media buzz around the Big Ten surrounded the Northwestern Wildcats who earned their way to an unbeaten conference run.  Because the Buckeyes held the tiebreaker over the Wildcats, the only thing between the Buckeyes invitation into the Rose Bowl and a possible National Championship was their rival the Michigan Wolverines. However, running back Tim Biakabutuka led the Wolverines to a 31-23 upset, sending the 'Cats to the Rose Bowl.

Tennessee started off the season with victories over East Carolina and Georgia, before heading off to Gainesville to play the rival Gators. The Vols held a 30–21 halftime lead only to be outscored 41–7 in the second half, suffering a 62–37 defeat. However, the team won their remaining 8 regular season games, including a 41–14 win over Alabama. The Vols ended the season ranked third.

Scoring summary

First quarter
Ohio State – Eddie George 2 yard run (Josh Jackson kick) – OSU 7, Tenn 0 2:07

Second quarter
Tennessee – Graham 69 yard run (Hall kick) – Tenn 7, OSU 7 0:23

Third quarter
Tennessee – Kent 47 yard pass from Peyton Manning (Hall kick) – Tenn 14, OSU 7 13:22

Fourth quarter
Ohio State – Rickey Dudley 32 yard pass from Bobby Hoying (Jackson kick) – Tenn 14, OSU 14 14:40
Tennessee – Hall 29 yard Field goal – Tenn 17, OSU 14 9:24
Tennessee – Hall 25 yard Field goal – Tenn 20, OSU 14 2:06

References

Florida Citrus Bowl
Citrus Bowl (game)
Ohio State Buckeyes football bowl games
Tennessee Volunteers football bowl games
Florida Citrus Bowl
Florida Citrus Bowl